James Douglas Peden (April 18, 1916 – April 11, 2005) was a Canadian basketball player who competed at the 1936 Summer Olympics.

Peden was inducted into the Canadian Sports Hall of Fame in 1979 and is considered to have placed second to Lionel Conacher, being named Canada's athlete-of-the-half century in 1950.

Born in Victoria, British Columbia, he was part of the Canadian basketball team, which won the silver medal. He played five matches including the final.

Inducted into the BC Sports Hall of Fame in 1967 as an All-round Athlete, Peden excelled in track, swimming, tennis, rugby, baseball, basketball, and cycling.

In the 1930s Doug and his older brother Torchy (William) competed in six-day bike races. They teamed to win the Six Days of Buffalo in 1937. Torchy was inducted into the BC Sports Hall of Fame for cycling in 1966.

When Peden was 13 he won the provincial under-15 doubles tennis championship, and at 18 the singles, doubles, and mixed doubles for Vancouver Island.

In 1936 he played rugby against the New Zealand All Blacks, distinguishing himself as the first Canadian to score against them, carrying "only two Maoris" on his back as he scored the try. Later the same year he played on Canada's Olympic Silver medal winning team.

References

External links
basketball BC profile
dataOlympics profile

1916 births
2005 deaths
Sportspeople from Victoria, British Columbia
Basketball people from British Columbia
Basketball players at the 1936 Summer Olympics
Canadian men's basketball players
Olympic basketball players of Canada
Olympic medalists in basketball
Olympic silver medalists for Canada
Medalists at the 1936 Summer Olympics